Tuckingmill is a small hamlet near St Breward, Cornwall. It is located within the parish of St. Breward. It contains a number of properties including a former reading room.

References

Hamlets in Cornwall